András Rapcsák (14 July 1943 – 3 February 2002) was a Hungarian engineer and politician who served as mayor of Hódmezővásárhely from 1990 until his death. He was succeeded by his deputy mayor János Lázár. He had been a member of the National Assembly of Hungary since 1994.

He died of pulmonary embolism on 3 February 2002, few months before the next parliamentary election.

References

External links
Dr. Rapcsák András (mkogy.hu)
Rapcsák András életrajza (origo.hu)
Rapcsák András: "Nehéz típus vagyok súlyban és viselkedésben is" (origo.hu)
Minden összefogás kevés volt Rapcsák András ellen

1943 births
2002 deaths
Mayors of places in Hungary
Fidesz politicians
Christian Democratic People's Party (Hungary) politicians
Members of the National Assembly of Hungary (1994–1998)
Members of the National Assembly of Hungary (1998–2002)